The 2011–12 TSG 1899 Hoffenheim season started on 31 July against Germania Windeck.

Review and events

Competitions

Bundesliga

League table

Matches

DFB-Pokal

Players

First-team squad
Squad at end of season

Left club during season

Statistics

Appearances and Goals

|-
 ! colspan=14 style=background:#dcdcdc; text-align:center| Goalkeepers

 
 
|-
 ! colspan=14 style=background:#dcdcdc; text-align:center| Defenders

 
 
 
 
 
 
 
 
 
 
 
 
|-
 ! colspan=14 style=background:#dcdcdc; text-align:center| Midfielders

 
 
 
 
 
 
 
|-
 ! colspan=14 style=background:#dcdcdc; text-align:center| Forwards

 
 
 
 
 
 
 
|-
! colspan=14 style=background:#dcdcdc; text-align:center| Players transferred out during the season

Sources

Notes

TSG 1899 Hoffenheim seasons
1899 Hoffenheim